The timeline of Dundee history shows the significant events in the history of Dundee, Scotland.

1100–1799
1190 – Dundee Parish Church established.
1200 – William the Lion deeds his younger brother David, Earl of Huntingdon superiority over Dundee and its port. 
1296 – Dundee Castle surrendered to the English.
1297 – William Wallace besieges and captures Dundee Castle.
1298 – Alexander Scrymgeour appointed keeper of Dundee Castle by William Wallace.
1306 – Dundee Castle retaken by the English.
1313 – Dundee Castle destroyed by Robert the Bruce.
1385 – John of Gaunt & the English captured and partially destroyed the town. 
1465 – Birth of Hector Boece a Scottish philosopher and historian.
1518 – Birth of James Halyburton the Scottish Reformer and provost of the town for 33 years.  
1564 – The Howff (a burial ground) established. 
1580 – Dudhope Castle extended.
1645 – Population of Dundee estimated to be 11,200.
1651 – Siege of Dundee: George Monck besieges and sacks the town on the orders of Oliver Cromwell.
1684 – John Graham of Claverhouse, 1st Viscount Dundee became constable. 
1732 – Birth of George Dempster of Dunnichen an advocate, landowner and politician. 
1797 – James Keiller & Son, a jam and marmalade factory, is established.
1798 – Dundee Royal Infirmary opens.

1800–1899
1801 – The Courier established as the Dundee, Perth and Cupar Advertiser.
1825 – Walter Scott writes Bonnie Dundee a poem and song in honour of John Graham, 1st Viscount Dundee.
1831 – Dundee and Newtyle Railway opens.
1835 – First jute cargos arrive in Dundee beginning the city's jute trade.
1836 – St Andrew's Cathedral completed.
1838 – Dundee and Arbroath Railway opens.
1851 – St Mary, Our Lady of Victories Church opens.
1853 – Royal Arch, built to celebrate a visit by Queen Victoria, is completed.
1855 – St Paul's Cathedral completed.
1863 – Baxter Park opens.
1867 – The McManus Art Gallery and Museum opens as the Albert Institute.
1870 – Balgay Hill and Victoria Park were acquired by the City as public parks. 
1871 – Legislation for slum clearing was established with the City Improvement Act.
1878 – First Tay Rail Bridge opens.
1879 – Tay Bridge Disaster: The Tay Rail Bridge collapses killing around 75 people.
1881 – University of Dundee established.
1887 – Second Tay Rail Bridge opens.
1888 – Abertay University established as Dundee Institute of Technology.
1889
King's Cross Hospital opens.
Dundee granted city status.
1891 – Population of Dundee estimated to be 153,587.
1893 – Maryfield Hospital opens as a hospital for the poor.
1897 – Dundee Women's Hospital opens.
1899 – Royal Victoria Hospital opens.

1900–1999
1901 – Population of Dundee estimated to be 161,173.
1906 – 1906 Dundee fire: a large fire breaks out in a warehouse storing whisky.
1909 – Dundee United F.C. forms as Dundee Hibernian.
1914 – Dundee Dental Hospital opens.
1923 – Caird Hall concert auditorium opens.
1925 – War memorial opens at the summit of Dundee Law.
1933 – Dundee City Chambers opens.
1935 – Mills Observatory opens.
1946 – Camperdown Country Park opens.
1963
 Royal Arch, built to celebrate a visit by Queen Victoria, is demolished.
 Dundee Airport opens.
1966 – Tay Road Bridge opens.
1967 – University of Dundee gains independent status.
1974 – Ninewells Hospital opens.
1978 – Dundee Synagogue opens.
1980 – Scottish League Cup Final takes place at Dens Park.
1982 – Dundee Repertory Theatre opens.
1993 – Timex strike: Industrial dispute between workers and management takes place over seven months resulting in the closure of the factory and the loss of hundreds of jobs.
1996 – Verdant Works Museum opens.
1998
 Dundee Royal Infirmary closes.
 Last jute cargo arrives in Dundee bringing an end to the city's jute trade.
1999 – Dundee Contemporary Arts Centre opens.

2000–present
2000
 Dundee Central Mosque opens.
 Dundee Science Centre opens.
 Dundee International Book Prize established.
2007 – Scottish Challenge Cup Final takes place in Dens Park.
2009 – Dundee International Submarine Memorial dedicated.
2010 – Dundee Museum of Transport established.
2011 – Dundee House, the headquarters of the city council, opens.
2017 – Dundee International Book Prize disestablished.
2018
First Dundee pride event held.
V&A Dundee Museum opens.
2019 – Dundee Synagogue closes.

See also

 Dundee
 History of Dundee
 Timeline of Scottish history

Notes

References

 Timeline
Dundee
Dundee-related lists
Dundee